The 1994 Australian Production Car Championship was a CAMS sanctioned motor racing title open to Group 3E Series Production Cars. It was the eighth Australian Production Car Championship and the first to be restricted to front wheel drive cars with an engine capacity of under 2.5 litres. The championship was won by South Australian Phil Morriss, driving a Nissan Pulsar SSS.

Calendar
The title was contested over a six round series with two races per round.

Points system
Championship points were awarded on a 20-15-12-10-8-6-4-3-2-1 basis to the top ten finishers in each race.

A separate Class B award was open to drivers of Group 3E cars of up to 1.6 litre engine capacity, with points awarded on a 9-6-4-3-2-1 basis to the top six Class B finishers in each race.

Results

References

Australian Production Car Championship
Production Car Championship